Christmas N' Memphis is a Christmas album by American rapper Indo G from Memphis, Tennessee. It was released on December 17, 2002 through Big Face Productions with distribution via Select-O-Hits.

Track listing 
 Frosty the Blowman
 All I Want for X-Mas Is My Charges Dropped
 Interlude
 Baby Momma Fuckin Santa Clause
 12 Days of Christmas
 Santas Ho House
 White Christmas
 Pussy Sales
 M-Town Christmas
 Big Mommas House
 New Years (Count Down)
 Dirty South
 Ball 'Til We Fall
 Memphis Grindin'
 We Got 'Em Blinded

Indo G albums
2002 Christmas albums
Christmas albums by American artists